Inayatabad is a village and union council (an administrative subdivision) of Mansehra District in Khyber-Pakhtunkhwa province of Pakistan. It is located in Mansehra Tehsil and lies to the north of the district capital Mansehra and lies in area affected by the 2005 Kashmir earthquake.

Villages
 Inayatabad (Main Village)
 Bhanda Peeraan
 Gandhian
 Chitti Gatti
 Chak
 Tootkay
 Nara

Gandhian
Gandhian is a village of Union Council Inayatabad in District Mansehra. It is located 34.39N 73.21 E Latitude and Longitude on main Karakoram Highway and is about 7 km away from District Capital Mansehra. Gandhian comprises small villages such as Jalalabad, Bela, Sheher, Narrah, Merra, Chak and Bandhian. A Siran River tributary flows through this village. Natural springs in Gandhian are source of fresh natural water. Gandhian is known for most important and unique Shiv Temple (dates back to Emperor Ashoka and Alexander the Great) of Hindu religion in Pakistan, where hundred and thousands of pilgrims come and pay tribute and homage to the same.

Terrain of this area consists of Plain fields, Plateau and Hilly areas. Land used for agriculture purpose is very rich and fertile in nature. Main crops of village are wheat, Vegetables, Maize and Tobacco. Whereas fruits like Apricot, Plum, Almond, Apple and Peach are also found here. Literacy rate of this Village is quite encouraging. Private sector educational institutions are growing in number. Gandhian has produced highly educated people who reached high echelon in field of Education, Armed Forces, Civil Service and Other professions.

100% of the present day population of Gandhian is Muslim (Sunni Sect). While few families also believe of Shia sect also exist. 90% of the population of this village speaks Hindko as their mother tongue, while remaining speaks Gojari, Pashto and other languages. Main tribes of this area are Tanoli, Gujjars, Ghakkar (Raja), Syed, Maliktanoli and Sulemani.

It is also notable to mention that owing to the famous Shiva temple of Chitti Gatti, there had always been a native Hindu presence in this region of Mansehra district. Indeed, the village name "Gandhian" being a testament to nature of the indigenous Khatri tribes, "Gandhi" itself being a Khatri Clan. Sikh presence in this region was also pronounced during the Sikh Empire era. In the ensuing violence of the Partition of India, tribes formerly native to this area including Hindko-speaking Khatris and Brahmins fled for the newly formed Republic of India where they settled in large numbers in Delhi, along with other non-muslim Hindkowans. Some, having converted to Islam, were subsumed into Islamic tribes and Biradris.

Education
Literacy rate of this U.C is quite encouraging. Private sector educational institutions are growing in number but Inayatabad Public School is the best educational institute of Inayatabad.  U.C has produced highly educated people who reached high echelon in field of Education, Armed Forces, Civil Service and Other professions.

Languages
90% population of this village speaks Hindko as their mother tongue, while remaining speaks Gojari, Pashto and other languages.

Tribes
Main tribes of this area are Swati, Tanoli, Gujjars, Kashmiries, Awans and Parachas.

See also
 Bhanda Peeraan

References

Union councils of Mansehra District
Populated places in Mansehra District